Finn McGill is a junior professional surfer from the Hawaiian island of Oahu. He was ranked the #115 junior surfer in the world by the Association of Surfing Professionals in 2014. His sister, Dax McGill, is also a professional surfer. In 2011, Finn won the National Scholastic Surfing Association’s competition for his age group.

On Dec 12th, Finn McGill became the youngest competitor to win the Pipeline Invitational at the age of 16 and earned a spot in the Pipeline Masters.

References

American surfers
World Surf League surfers
Living people
2000 births
People from Oahu